"Shoot" is a song by American rapper BlocBoy JB. It was released as the second single from his sixth mixtape Who Am I 3 on July 25, 2017.

The song has sparked a viral dance called the "Shoot".

Background 
The track was released as the lead single from BlocBoy's mixtape Who Am I 3. The track is 3 minutes and 10 seconds long.

Music video 
The music video for the track was released on July 25, 2017. The video was shot by Fredrivk Ali and features BlocBoy and other people partying on a basketball court.

Critical reception 
"Shoot" received generally positive reviews. Max Weinstein of XXL called the track "one of the hardest songs in Memphis", and that "you can't get the song out of your head".

Charts

In popular culture 
In May 2018, the popular video game Fortnite put the "Shoot" dance into their game, under the name "Hype".

Lawsuit 
On January 23, 2019, it was announced that BlocBoy JB filed a lawsuit against Epic Games, the company behind Fortnite for allegedly using his "Shoot" dance without his permission or compensation.

References 

2017 songs
BlocBoy JB songs
Songs written by Tay Keith